Take the fifth may refer to:
Invoking the Fifth Amendment to the United States Constitution's self-incrimination clause
"Take the Fifth", a song by Spoon from their 2001 album Girls Can Tell